Fanfare for a New Theatre is a 1964 composition for two trumpets by Russian composer Igor Stravinsky. It was premiered on April 19, 1964, and published by Boosey & Hawkes.

Composition and premiere 

This composition was written for the opening ceremony of the New York State Theater, as a part of the Lincoln Center for the Performing Arts. The two trumpets were meant to be placed at either side of the balcony, right at the entrance of the hall. Stravinsky dedicated it "To Lincoln and George", "Lincoln" being the company's administrator, Lincoln Kirstein, and "George" fellow entrepreneur and choreographer George Balanchine.

Analysis 

The fanfare takes approximately 40 seconds to perform and is one of Stravinsky's major miniatures. The textures are canonic and recall Stravinsky's late twelve-tone technique. It is widely based on rhythmic patterns and the intervals between the two trumpets are brisk, atonal and uneven. The work consists of only one measure bar after the first unison motive. After this bar, the work is measured by systems.

The main form of the row of the melodic line, according to the twelve-tone technique, is played by both trumpets, but not simultaneously. This row works in a symmetrical way, given that both the four first and the four last intervals are the same, but in reversed order. The work shows a thorough usage of all inverted, retrograde, and retrograde-inverted rows.

References

Further reading 
Leach, James D. March 2019. "An Accidental Discovery: Stravinsky's Fanfare for a New Theatre". International Trumpet Guild Journal 43, no. 3: 12–15.
O'Laughlin, Niall. November 1968. "Modern Brass". The Musical Times 109, no. 1509: 1050
Smyth, David. Summer 1999. "Stravinsky's Second Crisis: Reading the Early Serial Sketches". Perspectives of New Music 37, no. 2: 117–46.
Straus, Joseph N. 2001. Stravinsky's Late Music. Cambridge Studies in Music Theory and Analysis. Cambridge: Cambridge University Press. .
White, Eric Walter. 1979. Stravinsky: The Composer and His Works, second edition. Berkeley and Los Angeles: The University of California Press. .

External links 
 Work details, Boosey & Hawkes

Compositions by Igor Stravinsky
1964 compositions
Twelve-tone compositions
Compositions for trumpet